The Coventry Telegraph is a local English tabloid newspaper. It was founded as The Midland Daily Telegraph in 1891 by William Isaac Iliffe, and was Coventry's first daily newspaper. Sold for half a penny, it was a four-page broadsheet newspaper. It changed its name to the Coventry Evening Telegraph on 17 November 1941. On 2 October 2006, the Telegraph simply became the Coventry Telegraph, reflecting its switch to a morning publication.

The newspaper became a part of the then Mirror Group (prior to its merger with Trinity to become Trinity Mirror), in 1997. In April 2022, the publication had a paid daily circulation of just over 6,183 copies. Trinity Mirror is now known as Reach plc.

Historical copies of the Coventry Telegraph, dating back to 1914, are available to search and view in digitised form at the British Newspaper Archive.

History
The only day the newspaper was unable to publish was 15 November 1940, owing to the blitz raid on the city.

From 1946 until the end of April 2004, a separate sports publication, The Pink, was printed every Saturday evening. It provided coverage of sport from the Midlands, as well as national and international sport. The fortunes of Coventry City F.C. played a prominent role in The Pink'''. With the 1998-99 football season, The Pink became the first regional evening newspaper to provide same day reports from all FA Premiership matches.

In 2016, Coventry Telegraph launched a new weekly podcast, centred around goings on at Coventry City F.C., titled 'The Pink'.

The headquarters for a significant period of the paper's history was at 157 Corporation Street, Coventry, CV1 1FP. The foundation stone was laid by the then proprietor, Lord Iliffe G.B.E, on 21 November 1957.

In the 1970s, the Evening Telegraph had a regular consumer page called Watchdog, which was edited by Ken Burgess. Coincidentally, the BBC used the same name for what became its long-running Watchdog series.

In 1985, the local independent radio station (then known as Mercia Sound) and the Telegraph formed the Snowball Appeal, a charitable organisation whose aim is to raise money to help sick and needy children in Coventry and Warwickshire.

After 96 years of ownership by the Illife Family, American Ralph Ingersoll II bought the controlling interest of the Iliffe family's newspapers. However, in 1991, the managing director, Chris Oakley, led a management buy-out creating Midland Independent Newspapers. In 1997, Midland Independent Newspapers was sold for £297 million to Mirror Group. In 1999, Mirror Group merged with the regional newspaper group Trinity.

From 2 October 2006, the publication changed from an evening paper to a morning paper. To reflect this change, the newspaper's name changed to Coventry Telegraph. The switch to a morning paper saw a change in emphasis with the printed edition concentrating on exclusive and community news, leaving breaking news to its website.

In the summer of 2012, the paper moved its headquarters to Thomas Yeoman House at Coventry Canal Basin, in Leicester Row. The decision by the proprietors was a consequence of the changing patterns of work at the paper (and the industry in general). With the number of staff reduced and no longer needing the space for the discontinued printing presses, it was decided that a smaller, more modern headquarters was now necessary. In May 2017 the Corporation Street site was opened to the public so they could view it almost as it had been left when it closed. When the exhibition ends in July 2018 Complex Developments Ltd hope to turn the buildings into a 100-bed hotel.

In the summer of 2014, the newspaper began a social media campaign entitled #bringCityhome, which helped ensure Coventry City F.C.'s return to the city following their exile at Sixfields in Northampton. The campaign drew praise from national media and figures within the football world. It was shortlisted at the Press Gazette British Journalism Awards 2014 in the Campaign of the Year category and Simon Gilbert, who spearheaded the campaign, was nominated for Sports Journalist of the Year.

Editors

Current editor
The current editor of the Coventry Telegraph and CoventryLive is Adam Moss. He has been in post since September 2020, joining from Reach PLC Midlands, where he had taken over from former editor Graeme Brown, who left to pursue his new job as the editor of the Birmingham Live website. As well as serving as editor of Coventry Telegraph, Moss also serves as editor for Reach's main Leicestershire-based daily title, the Leicester Mercury and their digital news brand, LeicestershireLive.

Past editors
Below is an incomplete list of editors of the Coventry Telegraph and Coventry Evening Telegraph:
 Eric Ivens (1960–1973)
 Keith Whetstone (1974–1980)
 Geoffrey Elliot (1980–1990)
 Neil Benson (1991–1993)
 Dan Mason (1995–?)
 Alan Kirby (1998–2008)
 Dave Brookes (2009)
 Darren Parkin (2009–12)
 Alun Thorne (2012–14)
 Keith Perry (2015–19)
 Graeme Brown (2019–20)
 Adam Moss (2020–present)

Publisher
Coventry Newspapers Limited, a subsidiary of Reach PLC Midlands Ltd is the publisher of the Telegraph and a number of local publications.

EditionsThe Telegraph is published Monday to Saturday in the following editions:
 City (Coventry Telegraph)
 Nuneaton (Nuneaton Telegraph)
 Warwickshire (Warwickshire Telegraph)

Sister publications
Current:
 The Hinckley Times The Loughborough EchoFormer:
 The Bedworth Echo (closed 2009)
 The Coventry Times (formerly The Coventry Citizen) (closed 2015)
 Coventry Pink (closed 2004)
 The Hinckley Herald & Journal (closed 2011)
 The Kenilworth, Warwick & Royal Leamington Spa Times (formerly The Kenilworth Citizen) (closed 2011)
 Midland Farm Ad (now closed)
 The Nuneaton Tribune (closed 2015)
 The Rugby Times'' (closed 2009)

References

External links
Coventry Telegraph website
The Hinckley Times website
The Loughborough Echo website
Trinity Mirror Midlands website
Trinity Mirror website

Newspapers published in the West Midlands (county)
Publications established in 1891
Reach plc
1891 establishments in England
Organisations based in Coventry
Daily newspapers published in the United Kingdom